The 2022 Iowa Senate elections were held on November 8, 2022 to elect members of the Iowa Senate from 25 odd-numbered districts. Senators serve four-year terms in single-member constituencies, with half of the seats up for election each cycle. Primary elections were held on June 7.

Retirements

Democrats
District 27: Amanda Ragan retired.
District 33: Rob Hogg retired.
District 34: Liz Mathis retired to run for U. S. representative from Iowa's 2nd congressional district.
District 43: Joe Bolkcom retired.
District 45: Jim Lykam retired.

Republicans
District 3: Jim Carlin retired to run for U. S. senator.
District 6: Craig Williams retired.
District 15: Zach Nunn retired to run for U. S. representative from Iowa's 3rd congressional district.
District 32: Craig Johnson retired to run for state representative from District 67.
District 44: Tim Goodwin retired.
District 47: Roby Smith retired to run for treasurer of Iowa.

Predictions

Summary of Results
NOTE: Districts that will not hold elections in 2022 are not listed here.

Source:

Closest races 
Seats where the margin of victory was under 10%:

Detailed Results

Note: If a district does not list a primary, then that district did not have a competitive primary (i.e., there may have only been one candidate file for that district).

District 1

District 3

District 4

District 5

District 6

District 7
Democratic Senator Jackie Smith was redistricted from district 7 to 1. No Democratic candidate filed in district 7; therefore, the district is an automatic gain for Republicans.

District 9

District 11

District 13

District 14

District 15
Republican State Senator Zach Nunn decided to run for the US House of Representatives in Iowa's 3rd congressional district instead of re-election in this district in the Iowa State Senate. No Republican candidate filed in district 15; therefore, the district is an automatic gain for Democrats.

District 16

District 17

District 19

District 21

District 23

District 25
Republican Senator Annette Sweeney was redistricted from district 25 to 27. No Republican candidate filed in district 25; therefore, the district is an automatic gain for Democrats.

District 27

District 29

District 30

District 31

District 33

District 35

District 37

District 39

District 40

District 41

District 42

District 43

District 44

District 45

District 46

District 47

District 49
Republican Senator Chris Cournoyer was redistricted from district 49 to 35. No Republican candidate filed in district 49; therefore, the district is an automatic gain for Democrats.

References

Senate
Iowa Senate elections
Iowa Senate